The 1998–99 Japan Figure Skating Championships were the 67th edition of the event. They were held on January 15–17, 1999 in Yokohama. National Champions were crowned in the disciplines of men's singles, ladies' singles, and ice dancing. As well as crowning the national champions of Japan for the 1998–99 season, the results of this competition were used to help pick the teams for the 1999 World Championships and the 1999 Four Continents Championships.

Results

Men

Ladies

Ice dancing

External links
 1998–99 Japan Figure Skating Championships results

Japan Figure Skating Championships
1999 in figure skating
1999 in Japanese sport